The 1970 Rose Bowl was the 56th edition of the college football bowl game, played at the Rose Bowl in Pasadena, California, on Thursday, January 1. The USC Trojans, champions of the Pacific-8 Conference, defeated the Michigan Wolverines, champions of the Big Ten Conference,   USC flanker Bob Chandler scored the only touchdown and was named the Player of the Game.

Teams

Michigan

After early season losses to #9 Missouri and unranked Michigan State, the Wolverines won four straight games before their showdown with heavily-favored and top-ranked Ohio State for the Big Ten championship. Michigan shocked the college football world by upsetting the top-ranked Buckeyes 24–12 to tie for the conference title and receive the Rose Bowl bid. (Ohio State was ineligible anyway because of the Big Ten's "no repeat" rule, which was rescinded in 1971.)

Just days before the Rose Bowl, first-year head coach Bo Schembechler, age forty, suffered a mild heart attack and had to miss the game; defensive coordinator Jim Young was the acting head coach.

USC

Aided by a pass interference penalty on fourth down followed by a controversial last-minute touchdown, USC earned the Rose Bowl berth with a 14–12 win over rival UCLA in their regular season finale. The Trojans were making their record fourth consecutive Rose Bowl appearance, as the Pac-8 did not have a "no repeat" rule.

Game summary
The score was tied at 3–3 at halftime. With three minutes to play in the third quarter, USC quarterback Jimmy Jones threw a 33-yard touchdown pass to Bob Chandler to give the Trojans a  A scoreless fourth quarter ensured the USC victory.

Scoring

First quarter
 USC – Ron Ayala 25-yard field goal

Second quarter
 Michigan – Tim Killian, 20-yard field goal

Third quarter
 USC – Bob Chandler, 33-yard pass from Jimmy Jones (Ron Ayala kick)

Fourth quarter
 No scoring

Statistics
{| class=wikitable style="text-align:center"
! Statistics !!  USC  !! Michigan
|-
|align=left|First downs	||16||20
|-
|align=left|Rushing yards||195||162
|-
|align=left|Passing yards||128	||127
|-
|align=left|Passes||10–18–0||14–32–1
|-
|align=left|Total yards	||323||289
|- 
|align=left|Punts–average||5–41||6–36
|- 
|align=left|Fumbles lost ||0	|| 0
|-
|align=left|Turnovers by ||0||1
|-
|align=left|Yards penalized||38||20
|-
|}

Aftermath
USC finished the year undefeated with one tie, earning a #3 ranking behind undefeated and untied #1 Texas and #2 Penn State.  Chandler went on to play for the NFL for 11 years with the Buffalo Bills and the Oakland Raiders.  Michigan finished  and was ranked 9th in the AP poll (released in January) and 8th in the UPI poll (released after the regular season in early December).

References

External links
 Summary at Bentley Historical Library, University of Michigan Athletics History

Rose Bowl
Rose Bowl Game
Michigan Wolverines football bowl games
USC Trojans football bowl games
Rose Bowl
Rose Bowl